Jennifer Egan is an American novelist and short-story writer. Her novel A Visit from the Goon Squad won the 2011 Pulitzer Prize for Fiction and National Book Critics Circle Award for fiction. As of February 28, 2018, she is the president of PEN America.

Early life
After graduating from Lowell High School, Egan majored in English literature at the University of Pennsylvania. While an undergraduate, she dated Steve Jobs, who installed a Macintosh computer in her bedroom. After graduating, she spent two years at St John's College, Cambridge, supported by a Thouron Award, where she earned an M.A. She came to New York in 1987 and worked an array of jobs, including catering at the World Trade Center, while learning to write.

Career

Egan has published short fiction in the New Yorker, Harper's, Zoetrope: All-Story, and Ploughshares, among other periodicals, and her journalism appears frequently in the New York Times Magazine. Her first novel, The Invisible Circus, was released in 1995 and adapted into a film of the same name released in 2001. She has published one short story collection and six novels, among which Look at Me was a finalist for the National Book Award in 2001.

Egan has been hesitant to classify A Visit from the Goon Squad as either a novel or a short story collection, saying, "I wanted to avoid centrality. I wanted polyphony. I wanted a lateral feeling, not a forward feeling. My ground rules were: every piece has to be very different, from a different point of view. I actually tried to break that rule later; if you make a rule then you also should break it!" The book features genre-bending content such as a chapter entirely formatted as a Microsoft PowerPoint presentation. Of her inspiration and approach to the work, she said, "I don't experience time as linear. I experience it in layers that seem to coexist... One thing that facilitates that kind of time travel is music, which is why I think music ended up being such an important part of the book. Also, I was reading Proust. He tries, very successfully in some ways, to capture the sense of time passing, the quality of consciousness, and the ways to get around linearity, which is the weird scourge of writing prose."

Awards
Egan received a Thouron Award in 1986, was the recipient of a National Endowment for the Arts Fellowship, and a Guggenheim Fellowship in 1996. In 2002 she wrote a cover story on homeless children that received the Carroll Kowal Journalism Award. She was a fellow at the Dorothy and Lewis B. Cullman Center for Scholars and Writers at the New York Public Library in 2004–2005. Her 2008 story on bipolar children won an Outstanding Media Award from the National Alliance on Mental Illness. In 2011 she was a finalist for the PEN/Faulkner Award for Fiction. That same year she won the National Book Critics Circle Award (Fiction), the Los Angeles Times Book Prize, and Pulitzer Prize for A Visit from the Goon Squad.

Egan won the 2018 Andrew Carnegie Medal for Manhattan Beach. The novel was also longlisted for the 2017 National Book Award.

Reception

Academic literary critics have examined Egan's work in a variety of contexts. David Cowart has read Egan's project in A Visit from the Goon Squad as indebted to modernist writing but as possessing a closer affinity to postmodernism, in which "she meets the parental postmoderns on their own ground; by the same token, she venerates the grandparental moderns even as she places their mythography under erasure and dismantles their supreme fictions,"  an aspect also touched upon by Adam Kelly. Baoyu Nie has focused, alternatively, on the ways in which "Egan draws the reader into the addressee role" through the use of second-person narrative technique in her Twitter fiction. Finally, Martin Paul Eve has argued that the university itself is given "quantifiably more space within Egan's work than would be merited under strict societal mimesis", leading him to classify Egan's novels within the history of metafiction.

In 2013, the first academic conference event dedicated to Egan's work was held at Birkbeck, University of London, entitled "Invisible Circus: An International Conference on the work of Jennifer Egan".

Personal life
Egan lives in Clinton Hill, Brooklyn with her husband and two sons.

Bibliography

Novels
 The Invisible Circus (1994)
 Look at Me (2001)
 The Keep (2006)
 A Visit from the Goon Squad (2010)
 Manhattan Beach (2017)
 The Candy House (2022)

Short fiction (partial list)
 Emerald City (short story collection; 1993, UK; released in US in 1996)
 "Black Box" (short story; 2012, US; released on The New Yorkers Twitter account)

References

Further reading
Kelly, Adam. "Beginning with Postmodernism." Twentieth-Century Literature 57.3 (Fall 2011): 391–422. [On Look at Me]
Mishra, Pankaj. "Modernity's Undoing." London Review of Books 33.7 (March 31, 2011): 27–30. [On A Visit from the Goon Squad]
Strong, Melissa J. "Found Time: Kairos in A Visit from the Goon Squad." Critique: Studies in Contemporary Fiction 59.4 (January 2018): 471–480. [On A Visit from the Goon Squad]

External links

Jennifer Egan's website

"Jennifer Egan: By the Book". Interview. The New York Times, 2017.
Reviews & Scores for The Keep  at Metacritic.com
Book Review at Boldtype.com
"The Ghost in the Renovation" at This Old House website
Reading report from Happy Endings with Peter Behrens and David Rakoff, published at bookishlove.net (Nov 2006)
2010 BOMB Magazine interview with Jennifer Egan by Heidi Julavits 
Paul Vidich (Spring 2010). "Jennifer Egan, An Interview". Narrative Magazine.
Jennifer Egan: Chronological Bibliography of First Editions

Living people
20th-century American novelists
20th-century American short story writers
20th-century American women writers
21st-century American novelists
21st-century American short story writers
21st-century American women writers
Alumni of St John's College, Cambridge
American women novelists
American women short story writers
Lowell High School (San Francisco) alumni
National Endowment for the Arts Fellows
Novelists from Illinois
Novelists from New York (state)
PEN/Faulkner Award for Fiction winners
People from Clinton Hill, Brooklyn
Pulitzer Prize for Fiction winners
University of Pennsylvania alumni
Writers from Brooklyn
Writers from Chicago
Writers from San Francisco
1962 births